Nové Veselí is a market town in Žďár nad Sázavou District in the Vysočina Region of the Czech Republic. It has about 1,400 inhabitants.

References

Populated places in Žďár nad Sázavou District
Market towns in the Czech Republic